Petershagen-Eggersdorf is a municipality in the district Märkisch-Oderland, in Brandenburg, Germany.

Geography

Demography

Transport
The village is well connected to Berlin by the S-Bahn line S5 at the station of Petershagen Nord. The stop is so named (P. North) due to the existence of "Petershagen Süd" (P. South), a railway station on a line, now closed, from Fredersdorf to Rüdersdorf.

Twin towns
  Petershagen (North Rhine-Westphalia, Germany) - since 1990

References

External links

Localities in Märkisch-Oderland